Da sau nu is the Romanian version of Deal or No Deal, broadcast by Prima TV. It was first hosted by Virgil Ianţu, then replaced by Mihai Dobrovolschi. The show premiered on September 5, 2005.

Accepţi sau nu
This version in Romania, called Accepţi sau nu, is hosted by Gabriel Coveşanu. It premiered on March 1, 2008, with the top prize of 100,000 lei.

References

External links
 DasauNu.com Romania News

2000s Romanian television series
2005 Romanian television series debuts
2005 Romanian television series endings
Deal or No Deal
Prima TV original programming